Joseph Borg may refer to 
Joe Borg (born 1952), Maltese politician
Joseph Borg (regulator) (born 1951), American financial regulator
Joe Borg (screenwriter) (born 1986), Maltese-English screenwriter